The 1973 San Francisco Giants season was the franchise's 91st season, 16th season in San Francisco and 14th in Candlestick Park. The team finished third in the National League West with a record of 88–74, 11 games behind the Cincinnati Reds.

Offseason 
 January 10, 1973: 1973 Major League Baseball draft
Rob Picciolo was drafted by the Giants in the 2nd round, but did not sign.
Dave Heaverlo was drafted by the Giants in the 1st round (23rd pick) of the Secondary Phase.
 February 7, 1973: Skip Pitlock was traded by the Giants to the Chicago White Sox for Chuck Hartenstein and Glenn Redmon.

Regular season

Season standings

Record vs. opponents

Opening Day starters 
Bobby Bonds
Tito Fuentes
Al Gallagher
Garry Maddox
Juan Marichal
Gary Matthews
Willie McCovey
Dave Rader
Chris Speier

Notable transactions 
 April 2, 1973: Fran Healy was traded by the Giants to the Kansas City Royals for Greg Minton.
 June 5, 1973: Johnnie LeMaster was drafted by the San Francisco Giants in the 1st round (6th pick) of the 1973 amateur draft.
 June 5, 1973: Jeff Little was drafted by the Giants in the 3rd round of the 1973 Major League Baseball draft.
 June 7, 1973: Sam McDowell was purchased from the Giants by the New York Yankees.

Roster

Player stats

Batting

Starters by position 
Note: Pos = Position; G = Games played; AB = At bats; H = Hits; Avg. = Batting average; HR = Home runs; RBI = Runs batted in

Other batters 
Note: G = Games played; AB = At bats; H = Hits; Avg. = Batting average; HR = Home runs; RBI = Runs batted in

Pitching

Starting pitchers 
Note: G = Games pitched; IP = Innings pitched; W = Wins; L = Losses; ERA = Earned run average; SO = Strikeouts

Other pitchers 
Note: G = Games pitched; IP = Innings pitched; W = Wins; L = Losses; ERA = Earned run average; SO = Strikeouts

Relief pitchers 
Note: G = Games pitched; W = Wins; L = Losses; SV = Saves; ERA = Earned run average; SO = Strikeouts

Awards and honors 
All-Star Game
 Bobby Bonds, outfield

Farm system

References

External links
 1973 San Francisco Giants at Baseball Reference
 1973 San Francisco Giants at Baseball Almanac

San Francisco Giants seasons
San Francisco Giants season
San Fran